Health First Strathcona was primary care centre that opened in Sherwood Park, Alberta in February 2004.  The facility was opened to complement the regular care provided by family physicians, by providing after hours care for illness and urgent injuries. The centre closed on May 20, 2014, with its services being transferred to the Strathcona Community Hospital, which opened a day later.

Main services
Health First Strathcona offered basic doctor's office services.
Health First Primary Care Services
Health First Strathcona - Seniors' Clinic
Physical Therapy Clinics in the Community
Tobacco Reduction Clinic
X-ray

References

External links
Health First Strathcona

Medical and health organizations based in Alberta
Edmonton Metropolitan Region
Defunct hospitals in Canada